Gusztáv Rados (22 February 1862 in Pest–1 November 1942 in Budapest) was a Hungarian mathematician.  Rados specialized in number theory, linear algebra, algebra, and differential geometry. In 1936, he was awarded the Grand Prize of the Hungarian Academy of Sciences.

Education and career
Rados studied  mathematics at the Budapest University of Technology and Economics (1879-1883). In 1884 and 1885 he studied under Felix Klein in Leipzig and in 1885 returned to the Technical University in Budapest, where he became a professor and was temporarily rector.

Along with Julius König, Gaston Darboux and Felix Klein he was on the committee that awarded the Bolyai Prize.

In 1907 he became a member of the Hungarian Academy of Sciences. He was a founding member of the Physical and Mathematical Society in Budapest, and in 1913 its vice president and in 1933 its president. In 1936 he was awarded the Grand Prize of the Hungarian Academy of Sciences.

He was an invited speaker at the International Congress of Mathematicians in Zurich in 1897 and in Rome in 1908.

Works
 Zur Theorie der adjungirten Substitutionen. In: Mathematische Annalen. 48. Band (1897), S. 417–424 
 Zur Theorie der adjungierten quadratischen Formen. In: Verhandlungen des ersten internationalen Mathematiker-Kongresses in Zürich vom 9. bis 11. August 1897. Leipzig: B. G. Teubner, 1898, S. 163–165

References

Members of the Hungarian Academy of Sciences
Budapest University of Technology and Economics alumni
Academic staff of the Budapest University of Technology and Economics
19th-century Hungarian mathematicians
20th-century Hungarian mathematicians
People from Pest, Hungary
1862 births
1942 deaths